The Pride of Iowa Conference (POI ) is a high school athletic conference made up of 10 small schools in southern Iowa, United States.

Current members

Mount Ayr shares a football team with Diagonal.
Nodaway Valley shares a football team with Orient-Macksburg.

History

The conference was founded in 1987 with six schools: I-35, Wayne, Central Decatur, Mt. Ayr, Southeast Warren, and East Union. For the first 13 years of its history, the conference was quite small and compact. The conference added Nodaway Valley and Martensdale-St. Mary's in 1997, two schools in the same relative area of the state. In 2000 and 2001, the conference underwent a two-year, four-team expansion that more than doubled the geographical area of the conference. Corning (formerly of the Rolling Hills Conference) and Bedford (Corner Conference) joined in 2000; with Lenox (Rolling Hills Conference) and reaching into the Des Moines Metro Area by adding Pleasantville (Heart of Iowa Conference) in 2001. The conference has remained stable since then only losing two schools since 2001. In the fall of 2013, Corning and Villisca (Corner Conference) became Southwest Valley High School remaining in the Pride of Iowa for all activities. In 2018, founding school Interstate 35 and Pleasantville left the Pride of Iowa conference for the West Central Activities Conference, due to growing enrollment and proximity of schools to the Des Moines Metro, decreasing travel for both schools, especially Pleasantville. Beginning for the 2022-2023 school year, South Page School district will be whole-grade sharing with Bedford for the next 3 years. South Page had previously been associated with Clarinda, who competes in the Hawkeye 10 Conference.

State Championships

External links
 Official website

References

High school sports in Iowa
1987 establishments in Iowa
Sports leagues established in 1987